The metropolitan area is a type of administrative division in Portugal. Since the 2013 local government reform, there are two metropolitan areas: Lisbon and Porto. The metropolitan areas of Lisbon and Porto were created in 1991. A law passed in 2003 supported the creation of more metropolitan areas, under the conditions that they consisted of at least nine municipalities (concelhos) and had at least 350,000 inhabitants. Several metropolitan areas were created under this law (Algarve, Aveiro, Coimbra, Minho and Viseu), but a law passed in 2008 abolished these, converting them into intermunicipal communities, whose territories are (roughly) based on the NUTS III statistical regions.

The branches of administration of the metropolitan area are the metropolitan council, the metropolitan executive committee and the strategic board for metropolitan development. The metropolitan council is composed of the presidents of the municipal chambers of the municipalities.

List
The current metropolitan areas are:

 Lisbon metropolitan area (Área Metropolitana de Lisboa)
 Porto metropolitan area (Área Metropolitana do Porto)

The following is a list of those with mainland Functional Urban Areas (FUA).

References

 
Portugal
Subdivisions of Portugal